Lasse Strand (born 3 April 1974) is a former Norwegian football (soccer) defender. He played mostly for lesser teams in Norway, but also had a spell with Rosenborg BK from 1999 to 2001 and after that played for Bryne FK and Byåsen IL.

References / External Links
Rosenborg WEB - Lasse Strand
RBKweb - Tidligere spiller : Lasse Strand
VG Nett - Lasse Strand

1974 births
Living people
Footballers from Trondheim
Norwegian footballers
Rosenborg BK players
Bryne FK players
Byåsen Toppfotball players
Eliteserien players

Association football defenders